Lõhavere is a village in Põhja-Sakala Parish, Viljandi County in central Estonia. It has a population of 183 (as of 2009).

See also
Battle of Lehola (1215)

References

Villages in Viljandi County
Kreis Fellin